The Lion's Bride is a 1913 silent short film directed by Frederick A. Thomson.

Plot
Christine is the daughter of the owner of a menagerie. She does not fear Nero, a lion grumpy with everyone, who is always docile and kind to her. She manages to make him do the most difficult exercises, enters the cage without fear, cuddles him like a kitten and he lets her do everything. One day, however, Christine meets Basil McDermott who begins to court her until he becomes engaged to her. Basil dislikes the lion and Nero dislikes the newcomer, even though he is forced to accept him as his master. On the day of the wedding, Christine wants to go greet her lion and enter the cage. Basil goes to look for her to bring her back among the guests, but she asks him to leave her alone to say goodbye to Nero. When Basil returns, he finds his wife lying dead between Nero's paws.

Cast
 Julia Swayne Gordon: Christine Johnson
 Harry T. Morey: Basil McDermott, Christine Johnson's boyfriend
 Tefft Johnson: Mr. Johnson, Christine's father
 Mrs. E.M. Kimball (as Mrs. Kimball): Mrs. Johnson, Christine's mother
 Robert Gaillard: degenerate husband
 Nero the Lion: Nero
 Paul Kelly
 Adele DeGarde

Production
The film was produced by the Vitagraph Company of America.

Distribution
Released by the General Film Company, the film, a short film on a reel, was released in US theaters on June 23, 1913.

References

External links

 

1913 short films
1913 films
American silent short films
1910s American films